Rhizotrogus coiffaiti is a species of beetle in the Melolonthinae subfamily that is endemic to Portugal.

References

Beetles described in 1979
coiffaiti
Endemic arthropods of Portugal
Beetles of Europe